The Fateh (Persian from Arabic : فاتح) is an Iranian assault rifle developed by the Islamic Revolutionary Guard Corps Ground Forces, (IRGC). This assault rifle uses gas-operated reloading, using a 5.56×45mm NATO caliber from 30-round STANAG magazine. The IRGC initially introduced the Fateh rifle's prototype in 2014, but in 2016 the Iranian military discontinued it.

History
The early version of the Fateh rifle revealed in 2014 had a telescopic shoulder stock, which could be collapsed or retracted. This stock had an all-metal construction, except the plastic cheek piece and butt pad. The first models came with 20-round magazines, while the latter variant came with 30-rounders. This weapon also appears to use 40-round magazines and M16-style mags.

Design
The Fateh assault rifle is chambered with 5.56×45mm NATO ammunition with a gas piston system. A tiny tube is attached to the barrel assembly to recycle the gas generated by each discharged bullet.

An upper rail mount stretched almost the entire length of the weapon, offering ample space for detachable optics and sights. The receiver looked similar to Remington ACR with a NATO standard 30-round magazine.
There are accessories for various add-ons, such as vertical grip, bipods, laser pointers, or tactical lights. The muzzle brake of the Fateh is similar to the M16 rifle.

Users
Islamic Revolutionary Guard Corps Ground Forces (IRGC)

References

5.56 mm assault rifles
Assault rifles of Iran